Glenn Solberg (born 18 February 1972) is a Norwegian handball coach and former player.

Solberg was born in Drammen. His clubs included Drammen HK, FC Barcelona Handbol and SG Flensburg-Handewitt.

He was capped 122 times and scored 250 goals for the Norwegian national team.

From 2014 he was assigned assistant coach for the Norway men's national handball team. In 2015 he signed a three-year contract as head coach for the Norwegian handball club St. Hallvard HK, and in 2016 he terminated his assistant job for the national team.

Since 2020 he has been the head coach for the Swedish men's national handball team.

From 2021 he's also going to help coaching in the norwegian team Nøtterøy Håndball, with focus on the 16-18 year olds.

References

External links

1972 births
Living people
Norwegian male handball players
Norwegian handball coaches
FC Barcelona Handbol players
Norwegian expatriate sportspeople in Spain
Norwegian expatriate sportspeople in Germany
Sportspeople from Drammen
Handball coaches of international teams